Devyn Leask (born 29 December 1999) is a Zimbabwean swimmer. She competed in the women's 200 metre freestyle event at the 2017 World Aquatics Championships.

References

External links
 

1999 births
Living people
Place of birth missing (living people)
Zimbabwean female freestyle swimmers